Demetrious Johnson (July 21, 1961 – December 24, 2022) was an American professional football player in the National Football League (NFL), having played for the Detroit Lions and the Miami Dolphins.

Johnson was a native St. Louisan who grew up in the Darst-Webbe Housing Project. He was the youngest of eight children and was raised by a single parent. He graduated from McKinley High School, and earned a full athletic scholarship to attend the University of Missouri, Columbia.

During his years at Columbia, Johnson was recognized as a premier defensive back, including Big 8 All Star. He graduated with a bachelor's degree in Education with a major in Counseling Psychology. Upon graduation, the Detroit Lions drafted him.

Johnson’s professional football career lasted five years. During his career, Johnson was the Lions' defensive captain and earned numerous awards, including Player of the Week. Johnson ended his professional football career with the Miami Dolphins in 1987.

Following his retirement from pro football, Johnson joined Sherwood Medical Company, which is now Covidien, as the National Sales Manager for the Athletic Sports Medicine Division.

Understanding the importance of the community recreation center during his childhood, Johnson started exploring ways to give back to his community. With a deep desire to encourage and support underprivileged children to reach their potential, Johnson founded the Demetrious Johnson Charitable Foundation, Inc.

Johnson was married to his high school sweetheart for over 25 years with whom he had three daughters: Ashley, Taylore, and Alexandria. He had one other daughter, Lakisha.

Johnson died on December 24, 2022, at the age of 61.

References

1961 births
2022 deaths
Players of American football from St. Louis
American football safeties
Missouri Tigers football players
Detroit Lions players
Miami Dolphins players
National Football League replacement players